In the United Kingdom, a core strategy document is the key compulsory local development document specified in planning law. Every other local development document is built on the principles it sets out, regarding the development and use of land in a local planning authority's area. The principles should be in accordance with the community strategy.

The core strategy document usually lasts for 15 years.

Legal requirements
Additional to the requirements of all local development documents, core strategy documents:-
Should be location specific rather than site specific and so may be illustrated by a key diagram or on Ordnance Survey-based proposal maps. 
May need to be expressed as criteria-based policies.

See also
Development plan document
Local plan
The Town and Country Planning (Local Development) (England) Regulations 2004

Examples
Tunbridge Wells Borough Council
Manchester City Council

References

External links
Statutory Instrument (2004/2204)

United Kingdom planning policy